Yohan Lachor (born 17 January 1976) is a French football manager and former football defender.

Career
Lachor began his career as part of the youth academy at French club RC Lens. Lachor contributed 27 appearances as his side won 1997–98 French Division 1. He left the club in 2000, to join Swiss side Servette FC on loan, before moving back to Lens. In 2006, he left his boyhood club to join CS Sedan, before joining Ligue 2 side US Boulogne in 2008 helping the club to reach Ligue 1 in 2009.

Managerial career
On 13 June 2021, Lachor was appointed as the manager of Vimy in the Championnat National 3.

Honours

Club
Lens
 French Division 1: 1997–98
 Coupe de la Ligue: 1998–99
 UEFA Intertoto Cup: 2005

References

External links
 
 Profile on Site RCL

1976 births
Living people
People from Aire-sur-la-Lys
Sportspeople from Pas-de-Calais
Association football defenders
French footballers
French football managers
French expatriate footballers
Ligue 2 players
Ligue 1 players
Swiss Super League players
US Boulogne players
RC Lens players
CS Sedan Ardennes players
Servette FC players
Expatriate footballers in Switzerland
Footballers from Hauts-de-France
French expatriate sportspeople in Switzerland